Purna Kamdev  is a village of Nalbari district in Western Assam under 11 No. Deharkuchi Gram Panchayat of Borigog Banbhag Development Block. This village is situated on the bank of Baralia river.

Language
The primary language used in Purna Kamdev is Kamrupi, as in Nalbari district and Kamrup region.

Notable people
 Dilip Saikia

See also
 Villages of Nalbari District

References

External links
 

Villages in Nalbari district